Nisaga simplex is a moth in the family Eupterotidae. It was described by Francis Walker in 1855. It is found in Bangladesh.

The forewings are whitish, yellowish or reddish brown, the interspaces with very broad dark red-brown streaks, which may be partially or (in form modesta) quite obsolete.

The larvae have been reared from various grasses and have been recorded as a pest of rice. Other recorded food plants are maize, sorghum, finger millet, sugarcane, Cynodon dactylon, Echinochloa species, Leersia hexandra and Panicum repens. Pupation takes place in the soil. The species overwinters in the pupal stage.

References

Eupterotinae
moths described in 1855